Levy Mashiane (born 17 March 1996) is a South African professional soccer player who plays as a midfielder for South African Premier Division club Royal AM.

References

1996 births
Living people
South African soccer players
Association football midfielders
Royal Eagles F.C. players
South African Premier Division players
National First Division players